Phytophthora pseudosyringae is a semi-papillate homothallic soil-borne plant pathogen causing root and collar rot of broadleaf tree species in Europe. It is associated with necrotic fine roots and stem necroses of Fagus sylvatica and Alnus glutinosa, and isolates are moderately aggressive to fine roots of oaks and beech (Nothofagus), highly aggressive to holly leaves and apple fruits, and slightly pathogenic to alder bark.
It belongs to the class of oomycetes and is often described as a ‘fungal-like’ organism since they form a heterotrophic mycelium as the ‘true fungi’, but in contrast, their cell wall lacks chitin and is composed only of cellulose and glucans.

References

External links
Phytophthora pseudosyringae – first findings on bilberry in the UK
Ecology of Phytophthora nemorosa and Phytophthora pseudosyringae in Mixed Evergreen Forests

pseudosyringae
Water mould plant pathogens and diseases
Tree diseases